Fonds commun de placement translates to "investment funds" or "mutual funds", and are open-ended collective investment funds based that are neither trust or company law based.  They are similar to common contractual funds in Ireland, tax transparent funds in the UK and "fondsen voor gemene rekening" in the Netherlands.

In France, commonly referred to as FCP or F.C.P., these financial instruments are collective investments that are similar to the SICAV. They are not investment companies; they are more like open partnerships. They have no independent legal status but exist as a set of defined relationships between investors, managers and custodian. They invest in different financial instruments, but they do not have the tax status of the SICAV.

They are typically issued in the French-speaking countries of Europe.

See also 
 Common fund
 Collective investment scheme

References 

Investment funds